Mount Koven could mean:

 Mount Koven (Alaska), a peak of the Alaska Range northeast of Mount McKinley (Denali)
 Mount Koven (Wyoming), a peak in the Wind River Range of Wyoming